Daniel Mudau (born 4 September 1968) is a South African former footballer who played at both professional and international levels as a striker.

Early life
Daniel Mbulaheni Mudau was born on 4 September 1968 in Mamelodi.

Career
Mudau played club football for Ratanang Maholosiane and Mamelodi Sundowns; he also earned sixteen caps for the South African national side between 1993 and 2000, scoring 3 goals.

He is the all-time top goal scorer for the Mamelodi Sundowns.

International career
He made his debut on 6 October 1993 in a 4-0 loss against Mexico. Mudau scored his first goal in a 3-2 win over Mozambique in the 70th minute on 30 September 1995. His last international came exactly 4 years later versus Saudi Arabia. He was part of the squad that won the 1996 African Cup of Nations.

Career statistics

International goals

References

1968 births
Living people
People from Mamelodi
South African soccer players
South Africa international soccer players
1996 African Cup of Nations players
2000 African Cup of Nations players
Association football forwards
Mamelodi Sundowns F.C. players
Sportspeople from Gauteng